Rory McAllister may refer to:

Rory McAllister (footballer) (born 1987), Scottish footballer currently playing for Montrose
Rory McAllister (wrestler), member of The Highlanders tag team